

1999-2000

Final standings
Note: GP = Games played, W = Wins, L = Losses, T = Ties, GF = Goals for, GA = Goals against, Pts = Points.

Playoffs

Eastern Division Final
Montréal Wingstar vs Sainte-Julie Pantheres
 Saturday March 4, 2000: Sainte-Julie Pantheres 6 Montréal Wingstar 0
 Sunday March 5, 2000: Montréal Wingstar 2 Sainte-Julie Pantheres 1
 Sunday March 5, 2000 : Overtime tiebreaker: Montréal Wingstar 0 Sainte-Julie Panthères 1

Sainte-Julie Pantheres wins series 1-1 (1-0 win in overtime tiebreaker)

Western Division Final
Brampton Thunder vs Beatrice Aeros
 Saturday March 4, 2000 : Beatrice Aeros 4 Brampton Thunder 3
 Monday, March 6, 2000: Brampton Thunder 2 Beatrice Aeros 4

 Beatrice Aeros win series 2-0

NWHL Finals
In the first game, the Sainte-Julie Pantheres came back and tied the game 2-2. In the deciding game, Beatrice Aeros player Cherie Piper scored in the first period. That would prove to be the game-winning goal as Beatrice claimed the championship by a 1–0 score. Lauren Goldstein earned the shutout for the Aeros. Goaltender Marie-Claude Roy of the Sainte-Julie Pantheres was selected MVP for the Finals. She stopped 80 of 83 shots in the two game series.
 March 18, 2000: Sainte-Julie Pantheres 2, Beatrice Aeros 2
 March 19, 2000: Beatrice Aeros 1, Sainte-Julie Panthere 0
Beatrice Aeros wins title based on most goals scored.

The Beatrice Aeros won the Championship of the NWHL.

Team by team

Laval Le Mistral
In 1999–2000, Laval Le Mistral's Annie Desrosiers was second in the league in goals with 29. Her 45 points ranked eleventh in the league. She was an assistant captain despite being a 20-year-old. For the 2000–01 season, the team captain was 21-year-old Anik Bouchard. Two members of the Japanese National Team competed for Le Mistral. Masako Sato was second in team scoring in 1999–2000, and her sister Rie played only one season (1999–2000).

During the 1999–2000 season, Le Mistral allowed an average of five goals per game, second last in the NWHL. Goaltender Marieve Dyotte was 5-10-1 with a 6.44 goals against average, while Vania Goeury was 2-14-3 with 4.08 GAA. During the season, Laval received 605 penalty minutes. The result was allowing 44 goals in 35 games. Anik Bouchard had 91 minutes, Chartrand (88 minutes) and Valerie Levesque had 60 minutes.

Sainte-Julie Pantheres
During the 1999–2000 season, Sainte-Julie Pantheres finished ahead of the Montreal Wingstar in first place by one point. The club defeated Laval and Montreal in the playoffs, and faced the Beatrice Aeros in the finals in Brampton, Ont.

In the net, Marie-Claude Roy compiled an 11-6-4 record and a 2.02 Goals against average. The other goalie, Isabelle Leclaire, posted a 9-2-2 record and a 1.95 GAA. National team member Nancy Drolet scored 29 goals and added 17 assists. Mai-Lan Le scored 31 points in 31 games.

International
The NWHL had 18 players represent their respective countries at the 2000 Women's World Hockey Championships in Mississauga, Ontario. Rob Insley, of the Beatrice Aeros, will be equipment manager for Team Canada.

See also
 National Women's Hockey League (1999–2007) (NWHL)

References

National Women's Hockey League (1999–2007) seasons
NWHL
NWHL